The Harbinger (Lyla Michaels) is a superheroine appearing in publications by DC Comics. Created by Marv Wolfman and George Pérez, she first appeared in her civilian form in The New Teen Titans Annual #2 (July 1983) before taking on the mantle of Harbinger in Crisis on Infinite Earths #1 (April 1985).

A version of Lyla Michaels appeared in The CW television series Arrow, portrayed by Audrey Marie Anderson. In the series, she is the director of A.R.G.U.S. and wife of John Diggle. Michaels was also a recurring character on The Flash television series. Anderson's character temporarily became a more faithful version of the Harbinger for the Arrowverse crossover "Crisis on Infinite Earths".

Fictional character biography 
An orphan whose ship sunk during a violent storm, Lyla Michaels was rescued from certain doom by the Monitor, a cosmic being locked in an eternal war against his anti-matter counterpart the Anti-Monitor. Raising Lyla as his assistant, the two monitored the multiverse's heroes and arranged for weapons and super-powered henchmen for various villains, to test heroes that the Monitor would recruit for his impending final battle against the Anti-Monitor. The Earth that Lyla was rescued from was Earth Prime (Marv Wolfman said when asked on Facebook about what Earth was she rescued from).

When the Crisis on Infinite Earths began, Lyla assumed the identity of the "Harbinger" after entering a womb-like chamber which energized her and allowed her to create a series of doppelgangers in her new costume. These doppelgangers recruited a wide variety of heroes and villains to fight the Anti-Monitor's shadow demons and protect a series of vibration towers, designed to protect Earth 1 and Earth 2 from the wave of Anti-Matter destroying the DC Multiverse.

However, while recruiting the hero Arion, a shadow demon merged with one of the Harbinger's duplicates, allowing the Anti-Monitor to control her once her various doubles merged into a single entity. Under the Anti-Monitor's control, Lyla killed the Monitor. The Monitor foresaw the Anti-Monitor's gambit and arranged to have his life force be the fuel to power up the vibration towers, saving Earths 1 and 2 from doom. The shock of what she did caused Lyla to revert to a version of her normal form, which then sacrificed all of her powers to save the last three alternate universes (home of the Freedom Fighters, the Charlton heroes, and the Marvel family) from annihilation.

When the five remaining universes merged, the Harbinger suddenly regained her power in the process of time and space merging to create a new single DC Universe. Afterwards, the Harbinger recorded the history of the Post-Crisis DC Universe into a computer satellite. This led to the Millennium crossover, which had the satellite fall into the hands of the Manhunters, who used the data to confirm the identities of much of the Earth superhero population as part of a greater plan to infiltrate the superhero community. After the miniseries, the Harbinger joined the New Guardians. She reunited with fellow Monitor allies Pariah and Lady Quark during the War of the Gods crossover, after which she was offered membership with the Amazon tribe of Themyscira as the Amazons' official historian.

When Kara Zor-El, a.k.a. the original Supergirl, was discovered to exist in the Post-Crisis DC Universe and arrived on Earth, she was given shelter and lodgings on the island of Themyscira. The Harbinger befriended Supergirl and remembering how she sacrificed her life during the original Crisis, the Harbinger willingly died protecting Kara in a failed bid to prevent Darkseid from kidnapping her.

Donna Troy/Dark Angel connection 
During the events of the "Return of Donna Troy" miniseries, it was revealed that Donna Troy's arch-enemy (and temporal doppelganger) the Dark Angel served a similar role to the Harbinger during the original Crisis before severing ties with the Anti-Monitor. Furthermore, the Titans of Myth revealed that Donna was a temporal anomaly, thanks to the Crisis changing her and Wonder Woman's histories. The Titans, seeing potential in exploiting Donna's unconscious knowledge of the Pre-Crisis universe, rescued her as a child to manipulate her into becoming their own version of the Harbinger.

Following the events of the Infinite Crisis, Donna recorded a new version of the "History of the DC Universe" reflecting the changes in the timeline following Infinite Crisis. Meanwhile, a new incarnation of the Harbinger, a genetically altered being called the Forerunner was introduced that was tasked with killing anyone who crossed over between universes for the Monitors.

The Harbinger was reanimated as a Black Lantern during the Blackest Night crossover. She uses her knowledge of history to provoke her targets by bringing up emotional memories, but is destroyed with the other Black Lanterns.

In Multiversity #1, the AI of the Monitor watchstation known as the House of Heroes refers to itself as the Harbinger and bears a resemblance to the previous character.

In other media

Television

Lyla Michaels appears in The CW series Arrow and The Flash, portrayed by Audrey Marie Anderson. This version is an A.R.G.U.S. agent and ex-wife of Green Arrow's crime-fighting partner John Diggle. Once the Crisis is averted and the multiverse rebooted, Lyla is restored to her original self, and baby Sara returned to her; now as Diggle Jr.'s sister. In the series finale of Arrow, Lyla and Diggle move to Metropolis due to the former getting a promotion there.

Film
Lyla appears in the animated film Superman/Batman: Apocalypse, voiced by Rachel Quaintance. In the film she lives on Themyscira among the Amazons. When she begins to receive horrible visions of Kara Zor-El's death, she joins Wonder Woman in trying to save her. Over their time in Themyscira, the two bond and become very close friends. In trying to save Kara from Darkseid's forces, she dies in her place.

Video games
Harbinger appears in DC Universe Online

Toys
On July 7, 2005, the DC Comics owned company DC Direct released an action figure of the Harbinger as part of the line of Crisis action figures.

References 

Characters created by George Pérez
Characters created by Marv Wolfman
Comics characters introduced in 1983
DC Comics characters with superhuman strength
DC Comics deities
DC Comics female superheroes
DC Comics orphans
DC Comics characters who can teleport
DC Comics metahumans
Fictional characters who can duplicate themselves
Fictional characters with energy-manipulation abilities
Fictional historians
Suicide Squad members